Elaeocarpus miegei is a species of flowering plant in the family Elaeocarpaceae and is native to New Guinea, the Bismarck Archipelago, the Solomon Islands and the Tiwi Islands of the Northern Territory. It is a tall tree with lance-shaped to egg-shaped leaves with the narrower end towards the base, whitish to cream-coloured flowers and bright blue, elliptical fruit.

Description
There are between eight and fifteen stamens.

Taxonomy
Elaeocarpus miegei was first formally described in 1971 by Raymond Weibel in the journal Candollea.

Distribution and habitat
Elaeocarpus miegei grows in rainforest supplied by spring water. It is found in New Guinea, the Bismarck Archipelago, the Solomon Islands and the Tiwi Islands.

Conservation status
Elaeocarpus miegei is listed as "critically endangered" in the Northern Territory under the Northern Territory Government Territory Parks and Wildlife Conservation Act 1976.

References

miegei
Oxalidales of Australia
Flora of the Northern Territory
Plants described in 1971